is a Japanese director and storyboard artist best known for his works with Shaft and the anime adaptation of Sakura Trick.

Career
Ishikura began his career in the industry in 2000 as a production assistant for Invincible King Tri-Zenon under E&G Films, and made his debut as an episode director with the 18th episode of Shingu: Secret of the Stellar Wars. For the next several years, he worked mainly as a freelance director. In 2007, Ishikura had his first job with Shaft as an episode director and storyboard artist for Hidamari Sketch. For the next 5 years, Ishikura worked mainly with Shaft, and made his series directorial debut with Natsu no Arashi! Akinai-chū. The following year, he directed the third season to the Hidamari Sketch franchise, and began to work less with Shaft.

Works

Television series
 Highlights roles with series directorial duties. Highlights roles with assistant director or supervising duties.

Films
 Highlights roles with film directorial duties. Highlights roles with assistant director or supervising duties.

Notes

References

External links
 
 

Anime directors
Living people
Year of birth missing (living people)